Pangkham (Wa: Bāng kam), known before 1999 as Pangsang, is a border town in Myanmar's far eastern Shan State. It is situated at a bend on the Hka River near the border with Yunnan Province, China, opposite of the town of Menglian. Pangkham is the main town of Pangsang Township of Matman District of Shan State.

It has hotels, shops, a supermarket, karaoke bars, a bowling alley, and a 24-hour casino. There is a thriving night life centered on the casino.  Food in Pangkham is mostly imported from China. The cars, mainly Land Rovers, Land Cruisers and foreign pick-ups, have been smuggled in from Thailand.

History 
Pangkham is the de facto capital of Wa State, officially designated the Wa Self-Administered Division, while Hopang is its capital assigned by Myanmar government. It is controlled by the United Wa State Army (UWSA), the military wing of the United Wa State Party (UWSP) formed after the collapse of the Communist Party of Burma (CPB) in 1989.

On 17 April 2009, the 20th anniversary of the coup against the CPB was celebrated in Pangkham, attended by representatives from the military government, Kokang, Kachin Independence Organisation (KIO), Shan State Army - North, and former members of the CPB.

The next day, on 18 April 2009, a fire destroyed the largest petrol station and over 10,000 tons of teak in a warehouse in Pangkham, both belonging to one of the Wa leaders Wei Hsueh-kang.

The road from Panghkam to Metman is 48 miles long.

References

External links 
 Satellite map GeoNames
  Panghsang area mapShan Herald Agency for News (S.H.A.N.)
 Myanmar's Wa: Likely Losers in the Opium War  Pierre-Arnaud Chouvy, Asia Times, 24 January 2004
 Photo: Panghsang - bridge to the hidden city Something about Myanmar, 28 February 2006
 Photo: UWSA on parade at Panghsang The Irrawaddy, 4 May 2009

Populated places in Shan State
China–Myanmar border crossings
Wa people